Tizeti is a fixed wireless broadband Internet service provider (ISP or WISP) operated by  Tizeti Inc,  using Wireless to provide unlimited internet to residential and small business customers in Africa.  to connect its base stations to customer buildings. Tizeti currently operates within  Lagos, Ogun, Port Harcourt, Benin, Oyo, and Accra.

Background and availability 
Tizeti, Inc. was publicly announced in  Techcrunch in March 2017 by Kendall Ananyi in a Techcunch interview a week  ahead of YC Winter 2017 Demo day. , it was providing commercial service to customers in Nigeria and Ghana for $30/month. Tizeti is based in Redwood City, has about 300 employees in West Africa, and had raised $5.1 million of funding.

Tizeti  operates on the 5.4GHz Wi-Fi and 3.5GHz 4G LTE bands, connecting its Solar Powered Towers  to customer premise equipment on customer buildings . Wireless internet propagation is near line-of-sight, not penetrating buildings and windows. The customers connects to the service via wi-fi routers inside their building.

Tizeti operates a number of Services:

 Wifi.com.ng: Unlimited Wi-Fi internet subscription service that provides unlimited internet starting $30 a month to residential and small businesses in Nigeria.
 GhanaWifi.com: Unlimited Wi-Fi internet subscription service that provides plans starting $30 a month to residential and small businesses in Ghana.
 Tizeti Enterprise Solution: Dedicated internet plans that provide high capacity dedicated internet starting from 10Mbit/s to enterprise customers.
 Express Wi-Fi: Co-branded hotspot partnership with Facebook sold by retailers and targets dense, high traffic locations.
 Wificall.ng: Voice over IP service that provides unlimited calling, cloud PBX features and a voice api for developers.

Growth 
In January 2017, Tizeti was accepted into Y Combinator  and received a $120,000  on investment as part of the Winter Batch.

In June 2017, Tizeti announced its Seed Round after YCW17 demo day.

In September 2018, Tizeti raised another $3 million aimed towards expanding across West Africa.

In March 2022, Tizeti partnered with Microsoft Airband team to improve internet connectivity in Nigeria.

External links 

 Official website

References 

Wireless Internet service providers